Leonard Miller (born November 26, 2003) is a Canadian professional basketball player for the NBA G League Ignite of the NBA G League.

Early life and high school career
Miller was born in Scarborough, Ontario and played basketball, volleyball and golf during his childhood. He played basketball for Thornlea Secondary School in Thornhill, Ontario, helping the team win the National Junior Circuit title in March 2019. Miller transferred to Wasatch Academy in Mount Pleasant, Utah to face stronger competition but received limiting playing time. He transferred to Victory Rock Prep in Bradenton, Florida before missing several months with a broken right wrist in November 2020 that required surgery. Miller opted to play a postgraduate season at Fort Erie International Academy in Fort Erie, Ontario and had no college offers at the time he made the decision. He became the team's star player and received over 25 offers from college programs. Miller led Fort Erie to an Ontario Scholastic Basketball Association title and was named league most valuable player. He was selected to play for the World Team in the Nike Hoop Summit. On April 23, 2022, he declared for the 2022 NBA draft.

Recruiting
Miller was considered a five-star recruit by Rivals and a four-star recruit by 247Sports. On May 31, 2022, he announced that he would pursue professional options instead of playing college basketball.

Professional career

NBA G League Ignite (2022–present)
On September 7, 2022, Miller signed a contract with the NBA G League Ignite. He was named to the G League's inaugural Next Up Game for the 2022–23 season.

National team career
Miller won a silver medal with Canada at the 2019 FIBA Under-16 Americas Championship in Brazil, averaging 4.2 points per game.

Personal life
Miller's older brother, Emanuel, played college basketball for Texas A&M before transferring to TCU.

References

2003 births
Living people
Canadian men's basketball players
Canadian expatriate basketball people in the United States
NBA G League Ignite players
Small forwards
Sportspeople from Scarborough, Toronto
Basketball players from Toronto